Ash, Luttsy & Susie is an Australian Breakfast radio show made up of Ashley Bradnam, David "Luttsy" Lutteral and Susie O'Neill. It is broadcast on Nova 106.9 Brisbane from 6am to 9am on weekdays. They are the #1 Breakfast radio program in Brisbane, having won all seven radio surveys so far in 2019.

History
The show commenced with Nova 106.9's inaugural broadcast on 4 April 2005 starring Meshel Laurie, Ashley Bradnam, David "Luttsy" Lutteral and Kip Wightman. The show disbanded in 2009 with Wightman leaving to join his girlfriend Emileigh in Boston and Bradnam standing down due to personal issues. This eventually led to Laurie fronting a new show, Meshel, Tim and Marty.

The original breakfast show partially reformed in 2011 with Ash and Luttsy rejoining the station, alongside Camilla Severi and Dan Anstey.

In November 2011, it was announced that Kip Wightman would be re-joining the Breakfast show in 2012 to present Ash, Kip and Luttsy.

In May 2016, Susie O'Neill joined the show as co-host.

In October 2021, Kip Wightman resigned from the show after 15 years with the network.  Chris “Buzz” Bezzina was later appointed as anchor of the show.  

Ange Anderson is the newsreader and has been with the team since 2011.  She was also named Best Commercial Newsreader (FM) at the Australian Commercial Radio Awards in 2016 and 2019. Mitch Lewis (son of NRL legend Wally Lewis) is the sports reporter and has been with the show since March 2008, when he joined as an assistant producer. Camille Cannings is the Executive Producer with Samantha Spence on maternity leave.

Controversies
In June 2017, Lutteral made accusations on the show that comedy duo Hamish & Andy had stolen his idea for a show called Cracking Yarns which was used for True Story with Hamish & Andy. Lutteral said that he had shared his idea to Andy Lee three years prior during an encounter in New York City and later began filming a pilot for Channel Nine with co-host Bradnam which was never completed. A spokesman for Nine had denied the claims by Lutteral stating that "the program True Story with Hamish & Andy was conceived, and was in development by Radio Karate, over a year before Andy and Luttsy met in New York." On 8 June 2017 Lutteral apologised on the show over his claims that his idea was stolen. He said on the show "I fully accept now that that was not the case. I’ve now seen the concept document from 2013 developed by Hamish and Andy’s team for True Story. It is clear to me that they had conceived and documented the format for True Story over a year before I met with Andy in New York."

References

External links

Australian radio programs
2010s Australian radio programs
2020s Australian radio programs